The Musashi's are a musical group in Japan, consisting of five cats owned by musician/songwriter Hideo Saitō. The group is affiliated with Stardust Promotion; the contract with Stardust stated that each cat will be given one skipjack tuna approximately valued at 7000 Japanese yen (90.00 USD) per song.

Members 
Musashi (ムサシ) - leader; 4-year-old male Norwegian Forest Cat. Youngest but also the fattest.
Leo (レオ) - 4-year-old male cat. Quiet crying noise.
Luca (ルカ) - 6-year-old female cat. Quiet but high crying noise.
Seri (セリ) - main vocal; 12-year-old female cat.
Marble (マーブル) - 15-year-old female cat. When the owner picked her up, she was living on the street and in poor health.

History

2007
Toward the end of 2007, Saitō posted a video of the cats on YouTube to celebrate Christmas. In the video, the cats sing to the tune of "Jingle Bells" along with instrumental backup.  This video became popular with cat lovers, not only in Japan, but all over the world.  The YouTube video had over 1.2 million views by the end of 2007. It was also nominated for a YouTube award in the category of "Best Video of 2007".

2008
In 2008, the Musashi's signed a contract with Stardust Promotion. On March 3, they released their first single covering a popular Japanese song "Hotaru no Hikari".  This cover was accompanied by a new original song.  The single was a digital download from music.jp.  A second single titled "Ichinensei ni Nattara" was released on April 7, 2008.

2015
On September 24th of 2015, Seri had died at the age of 19. Seri had been battling kidney disease since 2 years prior. Their blog was opened up to make the announcement.

Discography

Singles 
2008-03-03 - Hotaru no Hikari
2008-04-07 - Ichinensei ni Nattara

References

2007 establishments in Japan
Former Stardust Promotion artists
Individual cats in Japan
Japanese pop music groups
Musical groups established in 2007